Ormetica sphingidea is a moth of the subfamily Arctiinae. It was described by Maximilian Perty in 1833. It is found in French Guiana, Guyana and Brazil.

References

Ormetica
Moths described in 1833
Taxa named by Maximilian Perty